Meriwether Lewis and William Clark was a historic bronze sculpture of Meriwether Lewis, William Clark, and Sacagawea located at Charlottesville, Virginia.  Known as Their First View of the Pacific, it was sculpted by noted artist Charles Keck (1875-1951), and was the first of four commemorative sculptures commissioned from members of the National Sculpture Society by philanthropist Paul Goodloe McIntire.  The sculpture was erected in 1919.

It was listed on the National Register of Historic Places in 1997.

On July 10, 2021, following the removal of the Thomas Jonathan Jackson and Robert E. Lee statues, the city called for an emergency council meeting where it was decided that the statue, along with the George Rogers Clark sculpture, would also be removed that same day. It was removed at the request of descendants of Sacajawea.

See also
Robert Edward Lee (sculpture)
Thomas Jonathan Jackson (sculpture)
George Rogers Clark (sculpture)

References

External links

Charlottesville historic monument controversy
Monuments and memorials on the National Register of Historic Places in Virginia
Bronze sculptures in Virginia
1919 sculptures
Buildings and structures in Charlottesville, Virginia
National Register of Historic Places in Charlottesville, Virginia
Statues in Virginia
1919 establishments in Virginia
Cultural depictions of Sacagawea
Sculptures of men in Virginia
Sculptures of women in Virginia
Historic district contributing properties in Virginia
Sculptures of Native Americans
Cultural depictions of Meriwether Lewis and William Clark
Monuments and memorials removed during the George Floyd protests
Sculptures by Charles Keck